Prospect Charter School is a public charter school in Prospect, Oregon, United States.

Charter status
Prospect applied for charter status, and received a $455,000 Charter Incentive Grant from the Oregon Department of Education in December 2008. It began the 2009–2010 school year as a charter school.

Academics
In 2008, 56% of the school's seniors received a high school diploma. Of 16 students, nine graduated, five dropped out, and two were still in high school the following year.

References

Charter schools in Oregon
High schools in Jackson County, Oregon
Public middle schools in Oregon
Public elementary schools in Oregon
Public high schools in Oregon